Khwāja Mumshād ʿUlū Ad-Dīnawarī, also known as Karīm ad-Dīn Munʿim, was a prominent Sufi of the 9th century. He was born in Dinavar, Iranian Kurdistan present day Iran province. He was disciple of Abu Hubayra al-Basri in Chishti Order and Junayd of Baghdad as well.

From Mumshad, the Chishti order transferred to Abu Ishaq Shamī and Suhrawardiyya order to Sheikh Ahmad Aswad Dinwari. He died on 14 Muharram 299 AH (11 September 911 CE) in Baghdad.

See also
Shah Jalal

References

Chishti Order
Sufi saints
911 deaths
Year of birth unknown
9th-century people from the Abbasid Caliphate
10th-century people from the Abbasid Caliphate